Khatatba is a town in the Monufia Governorate in Lower Egypt, 43 kilometers north of the Egyptian capital Cairo. It is just above the Khatatba Canal which branches off the Nile River.

History
Historically, the town served the role of a departure point from Cairo to the desert. Khatatba is the site of the Monastery of Saint George or "Dair Mari Girgis." It provides the regional Coptic population as a center for retreats and religious meetings.

Before he was President of Egypt, Gamal Abdel Nasser resided in Khatatba between 1923–24. Khatatba was also the site of the British Army's 8th Armoured Brigade.

References

Bibliography

Populated places in Monufia Governorate